Alice Neville, Baroness FitzHugh (c. 1430 – after 22 November 1503) was the wife of Henry FitzHugh, 5th Baron FitzHugh. She is best known for being the great-grandmother of queen consort Catherine Parr and her siblings, Anne and William, as well as one of the sisters of Warwick the 'Kingmaker'. Her family was one of the oldest and most powerful families of the North. They had a long-standing tradition of military service and a reputation for seeking power at the cost of the loyalty to the crown as was demonstrated by her brother, the Earl of Warwick.

Family

Lady Alice was the third daughter of Richard Neville, 5th Earl of Salisbury jure uxoris and Lady Alice Montacute, 5th Countess of Salisbury suo jure.
By her father she was a descendant of King Edward III through the legitimised children of John of Gaunt, 1st Duke of Lancaster and his mistress, later wife, Katherine Roët. Her mother was the only child and sole heiress of Thomas Montacute, 4th Earl of Salisbury by his first wife Lady Eleanor Holland. Lady Alice was the sister of Richard Neville, 16th Earl of Warwick, the wealthiest and most powerful English peer of his age. Warwick was the most important and influential peer in the realm, and one of the principal protagonists in the Wars of the Roses. Her aunt, Cecily Neville, Duchess of York, mother of future kings and Alice's first cousins, Edward IV and Richard III, was another key figure in the dynastic civil wars that dominated most of the latter half of 15th-century England.

Alice's other siblings included Lady Joan Neville, Countess of Arundel; Cecily Neville, Duchess of Warwick; John Neville, 1st Marquess of Montagu; George Neville, Archbishop of York and Chancellor of England; Lady Eleanor Neville (who died in 1472 before her husband was created Earl of Derby); Lady Katherine Neville, Baroness Hastings; Sir Thomas Neville (1443–1460); and Lady Margaret Neville, Countess of Oxford.

Lady FitzHugh's nieces, the daughters of Warwick, were Isabel Neville, who married Edward IV's brother George Plantagenet, 1st Duke of Clarence and Anne Neville. Anne was Princess of Wales as the wife of Edward of Westminster, Prince of Wales, the son of Henry VI and Margaret of Anjou. After the battlefield death of the Prince of Wales at 17 years old at the Battle of Tewkesbury on 4 May 1471, Anne eventually became queen consort of England upon her second marriage to Richard, Duke of Gloucester, who became King of England as Richard III in 1483.

Lady-in-waiting
Lady Alice, who was close to her niece Anne, was very supportive of the Duke of Gloucester after he had become Lord Protector of the Realm. She influenced her family members to do the same. When Gloucester ascended the throne as King Richard III in 1483, Lady Alice and her daughter, Elizabeth, were appointed by the queen to serve as her ladies-in-waiting. The two received presents from the King which included yards of the grandest cloth available to make dresses. At the coronation in 1483, it was Alice and Elizabeth who were two of the seven noble ladies given the honour to ride behind the queen.

The position of lady-in-waiting to the queens of England became a family tradition spanning down to Lady FitzHugh's great-granddaughter, Anne Parr, who served all of King Henry VIII's six wives.

Lady FitzHugh was very much the same temperament of her brother the Earl of Warwick. Although her husband, Henry, Lord FitzHugh is generally given credit for instigating the 1470 rebellion which drew King Edward IV into the north and allowed a safe landing of the Earl of Warwick in the West country, the boldness of the stroke is far more in keeping with Alice, Lady FitzHugh's temperament and abilities than with her husband's.

After the death of her husband in 1483, Lady FitzHugh along with her children Richard, Roger, Edward, Thomas, and Elizabeth joined the Corpus Christi guild at York.

Marriage and issue
Lady Alice married Henry, Lord FitzHugh of Ravensworth Castle, near Richmond (1429–72), head of a powerful local family between Tees and Swale. Lord and Lady FitzHugh had 11 children; five sons and six daughters:
 Sir Richard, 6th Baron FitzHugh, who married Elizabeth Burgh, daughter of Thomas Burgh of Gainsborough. Their son, George, inherited the barony of FitzHugh, but after his death in 1513 the barony fell into abeyance between his aunt Alice and her nephew Sir Thomas Parr, son of his other aunt Elizabeth. This abeyance continues to the present day.
 George FitzHugh, Dean of Lincoln from 1483 to 1505
 Alice FitzHugh married Sir John Fiennes, the son of Sir Richard Fiennes and Joan Dacre, 7th Baroness Dacre.
 Elizabeth FitzHugh, who married, firstly, William Parr and, secondly, Sir Nicholas Vaux. By her first husband, Elizabeth was the grandmother to queen consort Catherine Parr, Anne, Countess of Pembroke, and William, Marquess of Northampton.
 Anne, wife of Francis Lovell, 1st Viscount Lovell
 Margery, who married Sir Marmaduke Constable
 Joan, who became a nun
 Edward FitzHugh (dsp.)
 Thomas FitzHugh (dsp.)
 John FitzHugh (dsp.)
 Eleanor FitzHugh

Ancestry

See also
Percy–Neville feud

References

Further reading
 The Kingmaker's Sisters: Six Powerful Women in the Wars of the Roses by David Baldwin

Alice
Daughters of British earls
15th-century English people
Parr family
15th-century English women
16th-century English women
FitzHugh of Ravensworth